Somnath Rath (17 February 1924 – 7 October 2013) was an Indian politician. He was elected to the Lok Sabha, the lower house of the Parliament of India as a member of the Indian National Congress.

References

External links
Official biographical sketch in Parliament of India website

1924 births
Lok Sabha members from Odisha
India MPs 1984–1989
Indian National Congress politicians from Odisha
2013 deaths